Duilio Loi (19 April 1929 – 20 January 2008) was an Italian boxer who held the Italian and European lightweight and welterweight titles, as well as the World Junior Welterweight Championship. Loi fought from 1948 to 1962, and retired with a record of 115 wins (26 KOs), 3 losses and 8 draws.

Loi is considered one of the greatest fighters of all time at his weight and one of the best fighters to come out of Italy.

Biography

Loi was born in Trieste in 1929, to a father from Sardinia and mother from Friuli Venezia Giulia.

Loi fought many outstanding fighters in his career, including three bouts with lightweight great Carlos Ortiz. Although all their fights were close, Loi won two out of three bouts, which were all for the world light welterweight title.

The first bout, which was nationally televised in the US, took place on 16 June 1960 at Cow Palace in Daly City, California. In what would be one of only two US appearances, Loi was defeated after 15 rounds, with a controversial split-decision in Ortiz' favour.
Less than three months later the two met again for a rematch, this time in Loi's native Italy. The bout took place at Milan's famous San Siro stadium, in front of a record crowd of 65,000. Loi came through strongly in the late rounds to become World Champion by majority decision.
The next year a third bout took place, again at the San Siro. Loi knocked down Ortiz in the sixth and earned a victory by unanimous decision to defend his title.

Loi was inducted into the International Boxing Hall of Fame in 2005. His daughter Bonaria accepted the award on his behalf, because Loi was suffering from Alzheimer's disease. Loi died in January 2008 at the age of 78 in Treviso, Italy, and is buried at the Monumental Cemetery of Milan.

Professional boxing record

See also
 Legends of Italian sport - Walk of Fame
 Lineal championship
 List of light welterweight boxing champions

References

External links
 
 
 Duilio Loi - CBZ Profile
 https://boxrec.com/media/index.php/National_Boxing_Association%27s_Quarterly_Ratings:_1960
 https://boxrec.com/media/index.php/The_Ring_Magazine%27s_Annual_Ratings:_Junior_Welterweight--1960s

1929 births
2008 deaths
Sportspeople from Trieste
Italian male boxers
Lightweight boxers
Light-welterweight boxers
Welterweight boxers
World Boxing Association champions
World boxing champions
International Boxing Hall of Fame inductees
Deaths from dementia in Italy
Deaths from Alzheimer's disease